Ascension of Our Lord Secondary School is located in the City of Mississauga, in Ontario, Canada.

It is part of the Dufferin-Peel Board. It was originally established as a Middle School (Junior High School), but was converted to a Secondary School (High School) in the 1980s. The school building was expanded at that time to accommodate the extra students, and in the 1990s portable classrooms were added and removed as the student population expanded and contracted.

In 2005 the original building was demolished and a new larger structure was built. The facility was opened to students in January 2006.

In 2012, the Fraser Institute named Ascension as one of Ontario's fastest improving schools. Although a Catholic school, it is open to and welcomes students from all religious backgrounds.

History
The school opened in 1977. Originally it was a middle school. After 1984, when the Province of Ontario decided that Catholic secondary schools were to be fully funded, the school expanded into high school grades up to grade 13. The original school building was demolished in 2005. In January 2006 the current school building opened.

Notable students
Carlton Chambers - 1996 Olympic gold medalist in 4 × 100 m relay
George Stroumboulopoulos - media personality

See also

List of high schools in Ontario

References

High schools in Mississauga
Educational institutions established in 1977
1977 establishments in Ontario
Catholic secondary schools in Ontario